Sodium aurothiomalate (INN, known in the United States as gold sodium thiomalate) is a gold compound that is used for its immunosuppressive anti-rheumatic effects. Along with an orally-administered gold salt, auranofin, it is one of only two gold compounds currently employed in modern medicine.

Medical uses
It is primarily given once or twice weekly by intramuscular injection for moderate-severe rheumatoid arthritis although it has also proven itself effective in treating tuberculosis.

Adverse effects
Its most common side effects are digestive (mostly dyspepsia, mouth swelling, nausea, vomiting and taste disturbance), vasomotor (mostly flushing, fainting, dizziness, sweating, weakness, palpitations, shortness of breath and blurred vision) or dermatologic (usually itchiness, rash, local irritation near to the injection site and hair loss) in nature, although conjunctivitis, blood dyscrasias, kidney damage, joint pain, muscle aches/pains and liver dysfunction are also common. Less commonly, it can cause GI bleeds, dry mucous membranes and gingivitis. Rarely it can cause: aplastic anaemia, ulcerative enterocolitis, difficulty swallowing, angiooedema, pneumonitis, pulmonary fibrosis, hepatotoxicity, cholestatic jaundice, peripheral neuropathy, Guillain–Barré syndrome, encephalopathy, encephalitis and photosensitivity.

Pharmacology
Its precise mechanism of action is unknown but is known that it inhibits the synthesis of prostaglandins. It also modulates phagocytic cells and inhibits class II major histocompatibility complex-peptide interactions. It is also known that it inhibits the following enzymes:
 Acid phosphatase
 Beta-glucuronidase
 Elastase
 Cathepsin G
 Thrombin
 Microsomal prostaglandin E synthase-1

History of use
Reports of favorable use of the compound were published in France in 1929 by Jacques Forestier. Success was found in the treatment of Raoul Dufy's joint pain by the use of gold salts in 1940; "(The treatment) brought in a few weeks such a spectacular sense of healing, that Dufy ... boasted of again having the ability to catch a tram on the move."

It was recently discontinued from the US market along with aurothioglucose leaving only auranofin as the only gold salt on the US market.

References 

Gold(I) compounds
Antirheumatic products
Metal-containing drugs
Organic sodium salts
Thiolates
Gold–sulfur compounds
French inventions
Disease-modifying antirheumatic drugs